The Motru is a right tributary of the river Jiu in Southwestern Romania. It discharges into the Jiu in Gura Motrului, near the town Filiași.

Towns and villages 
The following towns are situated along the river Motru, from source to mouth: Padeș, Cătunele, Motru, Broșteni, Strehaia, Butoiești

Tributaries 

The following rivers are tributaries to the river Motru (from source to mouth):

Left: Frumosu, Valea Râsului, Cărpinei, Valea Mare, Lupoaia, Ploștina, Stângăceaua

Right: Mileanu, Scărișoara, Motrul Sec, Brebina, Crainici, Peșteana, Lupșa, Coșuștea, Jirov, Cotoroaia, Hușnița, Slătinic, Tălăpan

History 
The ancient Dacian name of the river was Amutria, which is homonymous with a settlement in the area.
The Dacian town of Amutria is mentioned in ancient sources like Ptolemy's Geographia (c. 150 AD) and Tabula Peutingeriana (2nd century AD), and placed around the river. After the Roman conquest of Dacia, Amutria was part of an important road network, between Drubetis and Pelendava.

References 

Rivers of Romania
Rivers of Gorj County
Rivers of Mehedinți County